Douglas Fletcher (born 17 September 1930) is an English former footballer who scored 60 goals from 188 appearances in the Football League playing as an inside forward for Sheffield Wednesday, Bury, Scunthorpe United, Darlington and Halifax Town. He also scored 8 goals from 17 appearances for Southern League club Bath City.

References

1930 births
Living people
Footballers from Sheffield
English footballers
Association football inside forwards
Sheffield Wednesday F.C. players
Bury F.C. players
Scunthorpe United F.C. players
Darlington F.C. players
Halifax Town A.F.C. players
Bath City F.C. players
English Football League players
Southern Football League players